Ilejemeje is a Local Government Area of Ekiti State, Nigeria, consisting of seven towns. Its headquarters are in the town of Eda Oniyo.

It has an area of 95 km, and had a population of 43,530 at the 2006 census. Its postal code is 372.

References

Local Government Areas in Ekiti State